Sideways is a 2004 novel by Rex Pickett. The novel is the first in the Sideways Trilogy.

Plot
The novel is the story of two friends, Miles and Jack, who take a road trip to the Santa Ynez Valley AVA a week before Jack plans to marry. Miles is a recently divorced wine aficionado who struggles to publish his novels. Jack is a charismatic television director who is determined to engage in a short affair before his marriage.

Film adaptation
In 2004, the novel was made into a film, Sideways, directed by Alexander Payne. The film received critical acclaim, and won the Academy Award for Best Adapted Screenplay in addition to being nominated for Best Picture, Best Director, Best Supporting Actor (Haden Church) and Best Supporting Actress (Madsen).

Sequels
A self-published sequel to the original novel entitled Vertical and written by Rex Pickett was released in September 2010. Payne has indicated that he is not interested in directing a sequel to the film based on Vertical. Fox Searchlight owns the rights to the characters, but Payne's lack of interest makes the film a non-starter for Fox.

A third novel, entitled Sideways 3 Chile, focuses on Chilean wineries and was published in 2015.

Stage and musical adaptions
In 2019 it was announced that Sideways was scheduled to be adapted into a Broadway musical. A play adapted by Rex Pickett from the Sideways novel was produced at multiple theaters in the United States and the United Kingdom, including at the La Jolla Playhouse.

In addition to the musical, it was reported that Rex Pickett had written screenplays based on his two Sideways sequels already in print, Vertical and Sideways 3 Chile.

References

2004 American novels
American novels adapted into films
Novels set in California
Books about wine
English-language novels